The Senate Finance Subcommittee on Social Security, Pensions, and Family Policy is one of the six subcommittees within the Senate Committee on Finance, within the government of the United States.

Members, 118th Congress

External links
Committee on Finance, Subcommittee page

Finance Social Security, Pensions, and Family Policy